In Greek mythology, Phyleus (Ancient Greek: Φυλεύς probably derived from φυλή phylē "tribe, clan, race, people") was an Elean prince and one of the Calydonian boar hunters.

Family 
Phyleus was the elder son of King Augeas of Elis and father of Meges by Eustyoche, Ctimene, Hagnete or Ctesimache. Timandra, a daughter of Tyndareus of Sparta, committed adultery with Phyleus and deserted her husband Echemus. Phyleus was also credited to be the father of Eurydameia, mother of Euchenor and Cleitus by Polyidus.

Mythology 
During the fifth labour of Heracles, the hero asked for payment from Augeas not revealing the command of Eurystheus. But the Elean king knowing the task imposed to the hero, he refused to give him his reward. During the arbitration, Phyleus, witness of the task, was called by Heracles to testify against Augeas. Phyleus supported the hero instead of his father in the matter of the Augean Stables thus in his anger, the king exiled both Phyleus and Heracles. After the latter killed Augeas and his other sons, he gave Phyleus the kingdom. During the time of his exile, Phyleus led a colony of Epeans to the island of Dulichium. Thus, his son Meges led the contingent from Dulichium to the Trojan War.

Notes

Kings of Elis
Kings in Greek mythology
Family of Calyce
Elean characters in Greek mythology
Mythology of Heracles
Laconian mythology
Princes in Greek mythology

References 

 Apollodorus, The Library with an English Translation by Sir James George Frazer, F.B.A., F.R.S. in 2 Volumes, Cambridge, MA, Harvard University Press; London, William Heinemann Ltd. 1921. ISBN 0-674-99135-4. Online version at the Perseus Digital Library. Greek text available from the same website.
 Diodorus Siculus, The Library of History translated by Charles Henry Oldfather. Twelve volumes. Loeb Classical Library. Cambridge, Massachusetts: Harvard University Press; London: William Heinemann, Ltd. 1989. Vol. 3. Books 4.59–8. Online version at Bill Thayer's Web Site
 Diodorus Siculus, Bibliotheca Historica. Vol 1-2. Immanel Bekker. Ludwig Dindorf. Friedrich Vogel. in aedibus B. G. Teubneri. Leipzig. 1888-1890. Greek text available at the Perseus Digital Library.
 Gaius Julius Hyginus, Fabulae from The Myths of Hyginus translated and edited by Mary Grant. University of Kansas Publications in Humanistic Studies. Online version at the Topos Text Project.
 Hesiod, Catalogue of Women from Homeric Hymns, Epic Cycle, Homerica translated by Evelyn-White, H G. Loeb Classical Library Volume 57. London: William Heinemann, 1914. Online version at theio.com
 Publius Ovidius Naso, Metamorphoses translated by Brookes More (1859-1942). Boston, Cornhill Publishing Co. 1922. Online version at the Perseus Digital Library.
 Publius Ovidius Naso, Metamorphoses. Hugo Magnus. Gotha (Germany). Friedr. Andr. Perthes. 1892. Latin text available at the Perseus Digital Library.
 Tzetzes, John, Allegories of the Iliad translated by Goldwyn, Adam J. and Kokkini, Dimitra. Dumbarton Oaks Medieval Library, Harvard University Press, 2015.